Weier is a surname. Notable people with the surname include: 

Armin Weier (born 1956), German wrestler
John Weier (born 1949), Canadian poet
Kelsey Weier (born 1991), American television personality and beauty queen
Lindsey Weier (born 1984), American cross-country skier
Lloyd Weier (1938-2003), Australian rugby player
Michael Weier (born 1997), Australian football player
Paul Weier (born 1934), Swiss equestrian